St. Paul's Church is a historic Episcopal church located at 204 Genesee Street in Chittenango, Madison County, New York.  It's a three-by-four-bay, Gothic Revival–style structure built with board and batten siding.  It was built about 1865 and features a forest of tall pinnacles and decorative trimwork on the front facade.

It was listed on the National Register of Historic Places in 1996.

Gallery

References

External links

Historic American Buildings Survey in New York (state)
Churches completed in 1865
19th-century Episcopal church buildings
Episcopal church buildings in New York (state)
Churches on the National Register of Historic Places in New York (state)
Carpenter Gothic church buildings in New York (state)
Churches in Madison County, New York
National Register of Historic Places in Madison County, New York